Alex Burl (August 8, 1931 – December 6, 2009) was an American football halfback. He played for the Chicago Cardinals in 1956. He played college football at Colorado A&M, now known as Colorado State.

Burl was inducted into the Colorado State University Athletics Hall of Fame in 2000.

He died of a heart attack on December 6, 2009, in Denver, Colorado at age 78.

References

External links
CSU Athletics Hall of Fame Bio

1931 births
2009 deaths
American football halfbacks
Colorado State Rams football players
Chicago Cardinals players